Richard Kilvington (c. 1302-1361) was an English scholastic theologian and philosopher at the University of Oxford. His surviving works are lecture notes from the 1320s and 1330s. He was a Fellow of Oriel College, Oxford. He was involved in a controversy over the nature of the infinite, with Richard FitzRalph, of Balliol College.

In the 1340s he worked for Richard of Bury, bishop of Durham.

References
 Barbara Ensign Kretzmann, Norman Kretzmann (eds), The Sophismata of Richard Kilvington, critical edition of the Latin text, New York: Oxford University Press, 1990.
 Barbara Ensign Kretzmann, Norman Kretzmann (eds), The Sophismata of Richard Kilvington, introduction, translation, and commentary, Cambridge: Cambridge University Press, 1990.

Notes

External links

1361 deaths
Scholastic philosophers
14th-century Latin writers
Fellows of Oriel College, Oxford
Year of birth uncertain